Trollenhagen is a municipality in the district Mecklenburgische Seenplatte, in Mecklenburg-Vorpommern, Germany. Formerly the home of an East German Air Force base. From 1949 to 1953 the Soviet 899th Fighter Aviation Regiment was located at the airbase.

References